Tegenungan Waterfall is a waterfall in Bali, Indonesia. It is located at the village of Tegenungan Kemenuh, also known as Kemenuh Village on the Petanu River in the Gianyar Regency, north from the capital Denpasar and close to the Balinese artist village of Ubud.
The waterfall is isolated but has become a popular tourist attraction. It is one of the few waterfalls in Bali that is not situated in highlands or mountainous territory. 
The amount and clarity of the water at the site depend on rainfall but it contains green surroundings with fresh water that can be swum in. 
The waterfall includes varying highs that can be climbed after the descent down stairs to reach it. This attraction also features a viewing point to the jungle and waterfall at the main entrance.

References

 

Waterfalls of Indonesia
Everything You Need to Know About Tegenungan Waterfall in Bali